Agyneta dynica is a species of sheet weavers found in Canada and the United States. It was described by Saaristo & Koponen in 1998.

References

dynica
Spiders described in 1998
Spiders of North America